Alita is a Lithuanian brewing company based in Alytus, established in 1963. Alita is one of the largest producers of alcoholic beverages in Lithuania. In 2004, when the state monopoly of liquor production in Lithuania was lifted, the company was privatized. In the same year, Alita acquired 95% stake of Lithuanian company Anykščių vynas, the oldest wine producer in Eastern Baltic region. Alita produces naturally fermented sparkling grape vines, alcoholic cocktails, ciders, vodka, brandy, concentrated fruit juice and exports its production to Germany, Latvia, Poland, Estonia, Japan, and other countries.

References

External links
Alita

Food and drink companies established in 1963
Wine companies
Drink companies of Lithuania
Companies listed on Nasdaq Vilnius
1963 establishments in Lithuania
Alytus
Lithuanian brands
Drink companies of the Soviet Union